The 2015 Morgan State Bears football team represented Morgan State University in the 2015 NCAA Division I FCS football season. They were led by second-year head coach Lee Hull and played their home games at Hughes Stadium. Morgan State was a member of the Mid-Eastern Athletic Conference(MEAC). They finished the season 4–6, 4–4 in MEAC play to finish in a tie for sixth place.

On February 8, 2016, Hull resigned to become the wide receivers coach for the Indianapolis Colts of the National Football League (NFL). He finished at Morgan State with a two year record of 12–12.

Schedule

Source: Schedule

± Virginia-Lynchburg didn't meet NCAA accreditation guidelines and all stats and records from this game do not count.

References

Morgan State
Morgan State Bears football seasons
Morgan State Bears football